Nyamiha is a Minsk Metro station. The station opened on December 31, 1990. 

It is located by the Nyamiha Street, both being named after the Niamiha River. In 1999 it was the site of the Nyamiha stampede, in which 53 people were crushed to death.

Gallery

References

Minsk Metro stations
Railway stations opened in 1990